Baohua is a town in Nanjian Yi Autonomous County, Yunnan, China.

Administrative division
As of 2018, the town is divided into ten villages: 
 Baohua
 Yunhua
 Meixing
 Tujie
 Guangle
 Baizhu
 Yongzheng
 Xiaotieyao
 Hujie
 Wuliang

History
During the Great Leap Forward, it known as "Baohua Commune". It was upgraded to a town in 1988.

Geography
The town is situated at eastern Nanjian Yi Autonomous County. The town is bordered to the north by Nanjian Town, to the east by Midu County and Wuliangshan Town, to the south by Gonglang Town, and to the west by Yongcui Township.

The Dalongtan Reservoir is located in the town.

Economy
The principal industries in the area are agriculture. Tobacco, walnut, bean are the economic plants of this region. Food crops are mainly rice, wheat, and barley. The region abounds with iron and copper.

Demographics

As of 2020, the National Bureau of Statistics of China estimates the town's population now to be 31,566.

Tourist attractions
The Stone Cave Temple is a Buddhist temple located in the town, it was originally built in late Ming (1368–1644) and early Qing dynasties (1644–1911).

Transportation
The National Highway G214 passes across the town north to south.

The S37 Hu-Ning Expressway is a north–south highway passing through the western town.

References

Bibliography

Divisions of Nanjian Yi Autonomous County